The 1967 Wayne State Tartars football team represented Wayne State University as an independent during the 1967 NCAA College Division football season. The team compiled a 7–2 record, averaged 376.1 yard of total offense per game, and scored 275 points and 40 touchdowns, each of which was a school record at the time. Vernon Gale was in his third year as the team's head coach. The team's tallies of 48 points against  and 49 points against  were the highest point totals by a Wayne football team since 1951.

The team began the season with seven consecutive victories. In the sixth victory against Eastern Michigan, a capacity crowd was drawn to Tartar Field, leading Detroit Free Press columnist Joe Falls to write: "They were standing on rooftops, fence tops, car tops and tree tops – anything that would hold them. They jammed into those rickety old porches along Hobart Street and they climbed telephone poles and held on for dear life. . . . This was backyard football at its best – maybe the finest moment in the history of Wayne State University."

The team's statistical leaders included quarterback A. J. "Apple Juice" Vaughn with 1,090 passing yards and 776 rushing yards and Paul Hay with 253 receiving yards. Vaughn set school records (since broken) with 17 touchdown passes, 207.3 yards of total offense per game, 1,882 yards of total offense, and a 142.01 passing efficiency rating. At the end of the 1967 season, the Detroit Free Press joked that "the Wayne State crew turned out more records in the past nine weeks than Motown, let alone the RCA victors."

The 1967 season was the last year in which Wayne State played its home games at Tartar Field. WSU Stadium opened in 1968.

Schedule

Players
The following players were awarded letters for their participation on Wayne State's 1967 football team:

 Leonard Boehm
 Jeffrey Cetlinski
 Wilfred Cortis Jr.
 George Crawford
 Alan Faigin
 Gregory Gargulinski
 Peter Garrisi
 Richard Goranowski
 Edward Grewe
 Paul Hay
 Louis Howson
 Restine Jackson III
 Leit Jones
 Charles Kirkland
 James Konopka
 David Krupski - co-captain
 David Lillvis
 Ronald Lock
 Edward Pavoris
 Joseph Piersante
 David Redman
 Douglas Rynaert
 Mark Rich
 Douglas Rowe
 Kenneth Semelsberger
 Marshall Shencopp
 Thomas Sheppard
 Ronald Solack
 Alexander Tischler
 A. J. Vaughn - co-captain
 Thomas Wilson

References

Wayne State
Wayne State Warriors football seasons
Wayne State Tartars football